This is a list of awards and nominations received by Wanna One, a South Korean boy band formed by CJ E&M through the 2017 series Produce 101 Season 2, under YMC Entertainment and CJ E&M. Wanna One has received a total of 49 awards.

Awards and nominations

Other awards

Listicles

See also
 List of awards and nominations received by Kang Daniel

References

Awards
Wanna One